Thomas Jefferson Strait (December 25, 1846 – April 18, 1924) was a U.S. Representative from South Carolina.

Biography
Born in Chester District, South Carolina, Strait attended the common schools of Mayesville, South Carolina, and Cooper Institute, Mississippi.
During the Civil War entered the Confederate States Army in 1862 and served throughout the war, first in Company A, Sixth Regiment of Infantry, and later as sergeant in Company H, Twenty-fourth Regiment, Gist's brigade.
He engaged in agricultural pursuits.
He taught school in Ebenezer, South Carolina, in 1880.
He was graduated from South Carolina Medical College at Charleston in 1885 and practiced medicine.
He served as member of the State senate 1890-1893.

Strait was elected as a Democrat to the Fifty-third, Fifty-fourth, and Fifty-fifth Congresses (March 4, 1893 – March 3, 1899).
He was an unsuccessful candidate for renomination in 1898 to the Fifty-sixth Congress.
He resumed the practice of his profession in Lancaster, South Carolina, and died there on April 18, 1924.
He was interred in Westside Cemetery.

Sources

External links 
 

1846 births
1924 deaths
Confederate States Army personnel
Democratic Party South Carolina state senators
Democratic Party members of the United States House of Representatives from South Carolina
People from Chester County, South Carolina
People from Lancaster, South Carolina